The Cementerio de San Justo, also known as Sacramental de San Justo, located in Madrid, Spain, is a cemetery near the Cementerio de San Isidro, which was originally called San Pedro and San Andrés. It is located between the Paseo de la Ermita del Santo and the Vía Carpetana, in the Carabanchel district. Its entrance is at number 70 of the aforementioned promenade of the Ermita del Santo.

History 
Its construction, which began in 1846, was completed by the end of August 1847. In 1847, it only had one courtyard—the San Miguel Courtyard, where the chapel is located and on whose altar is the effigy of San Miguel from the Franciscan convent of Los Angeles.

Notable burials 
This cemetery is the resting place of many famous Spanish people, including artists, journalists, poets, and singers.
 Mariano José de Larra (1809–1837), Spanish romantic writer and journalist.
 Elena Fortún (1886–1952), Spanish author of children's literature.
 Ramón Gómez de la Serna (1888–1963), Spanish writer, dramatist and avant-garde agitator.
 Carmen Conde (1907–1996), Spanish poet.

Gallery

References

Bibliography

External links
 San Justo Cemetery website
 
1847 in Spain
Carabanchel
Cemeteries in Madrid